Quebec City is divided into six arrondissements or boroughs.  These boroughs are the result of several waves of amalgamation and reorganization of the political boundaries of Quebec City.

 La Cité-Limoilou
 Les Rivières
 Sainte-Foy–Sillery–Cap-Rouge
 Charlesbourg
 Beauport
 La Haute-Saint-Charles

The six boroughs are further divided into 36 quartiers ("neighbourhoods"), which are  numbered instead of named.

2002–2009 

From January 1, 2002 to October 31, 2009, the city had eight boroughs: La Cité, Les Rivières, Sainte-Foy–Sillery, Charlesbourg, Beauport, Limoilou, La Haute-Saint-Charles and Laurentien. The boroughs of La Cité and Limoilou were merged on November 1, while the borough of Laurentien was dissolved and divided between Sainte-Foy–Sillery–Cap-Rouge and La Haute-Saint-Charles.

Former

Formerly, Quebec was divided into administrative districts, named quartiers, which were redivided amongst arrondissements at the time of the 2002 city mergers in Quebec.

 Cap-Blanc
 Duberger
 Lairet
 Lebourgneuf
 Les Saules
 Maizerets
 Montcalm
 Neufchatel
 Saint-Roch
 Saint-Jean-Baptiste
 Saint-Sacrement
 Saint-Sauveur
 Vieux-Québec–Basse-Ville
 Vieux-Québec–Haute-Ville

Former cities

Former cities are still commonly referred to by their former names even though their administrative structures no longer exist. This list includes cities that were merged in 2002. They are not boroughs, but many would be considered neighbourhoods.

 Beauport
 Bourg-Royal
 Cap-Rouge
 Charlesbourg
 Charlesbourg-Est
 Château-d'Eau
 Château-Bigot
 Courville
 Giffard
 L'Auvergne
 Lac-Saint-Charles
 Le Plateau
 Loretteville
 Montmorency
 Notre-Dame-des-Laurentides
 Orsainville
 Parc-L'Ormière
 Saint-Joseph
 Saint-Bonaventure
 Saint-Émile
 Sainte-Thérèse-de-Lisieux
 Sainte-Foy
 Sillery
 Val-Bélair
 Val-Saint-Michel
 Vanier
 Villeneuve

External links
 Map of pre-2009 boroughs

 
Boroughs, List of Quebec City Quebec